Tse Yi Gai High School is located in unincorporated McKinley County, New Mexico, near the Pueblo Pintado census-designated place and with a Cuba postal address. The school is in the Gallup-McKinley County School District, and serves grades 8–12.

Its attendance boundary includes Pueblo Pintado.

References

External links

Tse Yi Gai High School website
Gallup-McKinley County School District website

Public high schools in New Mexico
Educational institutions established in 2007
2007 establishments in New Mexico